Spring Creek Flat is a flat mostly in White Pine County, Nevada; but also partly in Juab County, Utah and still less in Tooele County, Utah.

References 

Landforms of White Pine County, Nevada
Landforms of Juab County, Utah
Landforms of Tooele County, Utah